Thurles Townparks is a townland of a little more than 365 acres in Thurles civil parish in County Tipperary.

The River Suir flows through the centre of the townland, with the older part of Thurles town on both banks. However, by the 1840s, the built-up area of the town had spread beyond the borders of the townland into the neighbouring townlands of Garryvicleheen and Stradavoher.

Townlands of County Tipperary
Thurles